Bahuwara is a village in Jagdishpur block of Bhojpur district in Bihar, India. As of 2011, its population was 1,462, in 216 households. It is located southeast of the city of Jagdishpur, on the Chher Nadi stream.

References 

Villages in Bhojpur district, India